Ian Tomlinson (1962–2009) was a newspaper vendor who died after being struck by a police officer.

Ian Tomlinson may refer to:
 Ian Tomlinson (athlete), Australia athlete
 Ian Tomlinson (scientist), director of the Institute of Cancer and Genomic Sciences at the University of Birmingham